Vishnevka is a rural locality (a selo) in Annovsky Selsoviet of Ivanovsky District, Amur Oblast, Russia. The population was 9 as of 2018. There is 1 street.

Geography 
Vishnevka is located near the left bank of the Ivanovka River, 19 km east of Ivanovka (the district's administrative centre) by road. Bolsheozyorka is the nearest rural locality.

References 

Rural localities in Ivanovsky District, Amur Oblast